The QF 2.95-inch mountain gun was the designation given by the British to a Vickers 75 mm calibre gun.  It was originally produced for the Egyptian Army.  It was taken into British service in the late 19th century to provide the 'movable armament' at some coaling stations.  Also known as 'The Millimetre Gun', it was used by the West African Frontier Force in several theatres in Africa during World War I. It was also used by United States and Philippines.

Service history 
The weapon could be broken down and carried by 4 horses or mules, or in British use in Africa by men.

British service 
The weapon was not adopted by the British Army or the Indian Army, which used the BL 10 pounder Mountain Gun and later the BL 2.75-inch Mountain Gun, but it was used from 1900 by the defence forces of some British African colonies as part of the Royal West African Frontier Force (WAFF). The officers and most NCOs were British, and the gunners, gun carriers and some NCOs were African. As part of the British Empire these units became part of the British war effort in World War I.

Thirty guns were originally supplied to West Africa (Sierra Leone, Gold Coast and Nigeria). Guns involved in the West Africa campaign were used by the Sierra Leone Company Royal Garrison Artillery (6 guns), Gold Coast Battery WAFF (6 guns), 1st and 2nd Nigerian Battery WAFF (6 guns each).

The guns seem to have been fielded in small numbers as stockade breakers during the War of the Golden Stool, as The Ashanti Campaign of 1900 mentions their presence and details their correct tactical usage as follows: "Vickers, Sons, & Maxim's 75-millimetre mountain gun will breach any stockade in from three to six rounds; it is therefore most essential for this gun to be kept well up in front, and as soon as the scouts have located a frontal stockade, the gun should be mounted, run up to the front, and take up a position where either the top or bottom of the stockade can be seen. While fire is being opened with the gun, a company should be deployed to either flank, to a sufficient depth in the bush to outflank the ends of the stockade."

Guns of the Gold Coast Battery fired the first British Empire artillery rounds of World War I, in the attack on Khra in Togoland on 22 August 1914.

The gun was also used in the East Africa campaign, originally a section of the Gold Coast Battery, and from December 1916 the 1st Nigerian Battery.

In one action, Corporal Awudo Kano and five Nigerian gunners stayed by their gun during the British attack near Melong in Kamerun, 4 March 1915. Their officer was wounded and the infantry forced to retire, but though isolated they refused to abandon the officer or their guns, and continued firing until relieved.

US service 
The US purchased 12 guns in 1899 and used them in the Philippine–American War (otherwise known as the Philippine Insurrection).
By 30 June 1904 another 120 guns were purchased. Carriages and pack saddles were manufactured at Watertown and Rock Island.

It was also used in World War II by US and Philippine forces defending against the Japanese invasion. Approximately 50 were issued to the Filipino Army artillery regiments.  The US Army Philippine Division had one battalion of the 23rd Artillery (Philippine Scouts) equipped with the 2.95 in mountain gun.

Ammunition

British ammunition 
The British "Treatise on Ammunition" of 1915 stated that available rounds were Shrapnel (203 bullets), Case shot (330 bullets), Star shell and the Double common shell of 18 lb (exploding charge of 14 oz "P" mixture – gunpowder).

US ammunition 
According to the US manual of 1916 the  "Double explosive" shell was no longer in US use.

Gallery

See also 
 List of mountain artillery
 West Africa Campaign (World War I)

Surviving examples 

 A British example is on display at US Army Ordnance Museum, Aberdeen Proving Ground, Maryland, USA
 HM Royal Armouries Fort Nelson, Fareham, Hampshire, UK
 At the Military Museum in Bogota, Colombia
 U.S. Army Artillery Museum, Fort Sill, Oklahoma, USA

Notes and references

Bibliography 
 Dale Clarke, British Artillery 1914–1919. Field Army Artillery. Osprey Publishing, Oxford UK, 2004] 
 Major-General Sir John Headlam, The History of the Royal Artillery : From the Indian Mutiny to the Great War, Volume II (1899–1914). Woolwich [England] : Royal Artillery Institution, 1937. Facsimile reprint by Naval and Military Press 2004. 
 General Sir Martin Farndale, History of the Royal Regiment of Artillery : Forgotten Fronts and the Home Base 1914–18. London: Royal Artillery Institution, 1988. 
 I.V. Hogg & L.F. Thurston, British Artillery Weapons & Ammunition 1914–1918. London: Ian Allan, 1972. 
 US Army Ordnance Dept, Handbook of the 2.95-inch Mountain Gun Matériel and Pack Outfit. 1912, updated 1916
 Louis Morton, "The Fall of the Philippines".  United States Army Center of Military History, 1953.

Further reading

External links 

 Handbook for the 2.95inch q.f. mountain gun, mark I mule equipment. 1906 from State Library of Victoria
 1908 (provisional) Drill Regulations for mountain Artillery US Army Manual provided online by University of California and www.archive.org
 2.95-Inch Vickers-Maxim Mountain Gun Matériel. in https://archive.org/details/handbookofartill00unitrich" Handbook of Artillery : including mobile, anti-aircraft and trench matériel (1920)"] United States. Army. Ordnance Dept May 1920. provided online by University of California and www.archive.org
 Diagram, photographs, video & data at Victorian Forts and Artillery website
 photo of a 2.95-inch shell casing at big-ordnance.com

Artillery of the United States
World War I artillery of the United States
World War I artillery of the United Kingdom
Mountain artillery
World War I mountain artillery
75 mm artillery
Vickers
Weapons of the Philippine Army